Cholpon Orozobekova (in Kyrgyz – Чолпон Орозобекова;  born on November 17, 1975 in At-Bashy District, Naryn Region, Kyrgyz SSR) is a prominent Kyrgyz journalist, mediapreneur, human rights activist and an analyst on Central Asian issues currently based in Geneva.

Biography 

Cholpon Orozobekova was born on November 17, 1975, in At-Bashy district of the Naryn region of Kyrgyzstan in a teacher's family.

She studied in the formerly Pogranichnik secondary school in the village of Pogranichnik (nowadays the village of Kazybek, named after Kazybek Mambetimin-uulu (1901-1936), the prominent dissident poet murdered by the Stalinist regime for his verses against Bolsheviks.)

She graduated at the Faculty of Journalism at the Kyrgyz National University named after Jusup Balasagyn.

In 1999-2007, she worked for international media outlets such as RFE/RL Kyrgyz Service, BBC Kyrgyz service and IWPR, while living in Bishkek.

She established and officially registered an independent Kyrgyz-language newspaper entitled "De Facto" in 2006 (its co-owner is her husband, Jengishbek Edigeev). And she was its editor-in-chief.

In 2008 summer time, she had to leave Kyrgyzstan to Switzerland because of threats by circles close to Janybek ("Janysh") Bakiev, a brother of  the then President Kurmanbek Bakiev, who was ousted from the authoritarian power by the people's revolution on 7 April 2010.

She currently writes analyses and op-eds for TheDiplomat Magazine.

Educational background 

She has a diploma in Journalism from the Kyrgyz National University.

She holds two master's degrees from top-ranking Geneva-based universities: an Executive Master in International Negotiation and Policy Making from the Graduate Institute of International and Development Studies and an MA in International and European Security from the University of Geneva.

Analytical journalism experience 

As an analyst, she published dozens of articles in English on Central Asian issues.

Her pieces have been published by Institute for War and Peace Reporting, The Diplomat, Journal of Turkish Weekly and the Jamestown Foundation.

Her research paper “The US drone policy under International Law” was published by The Institute of Regional Studies, Islamabad.

She worked as director of non-governmental centre “Media-Ordo” in Kyrgyzstan from 2002 to 2007, which implemented projects for professional development of journalists.

Cholpon also has experience in project management within international organizations based in Geneva, such as the Office of the United Nations High Commissioner for Human Rights and non-governmental organizations Human Rights Information and Documentation Systems, or HURIDOCS and Foundation “Au Coeur des Grottes”.

Media organizer and expert 

She is well known as a mediapreneur in Kyrgyzstan, as she had established an independent newspaper, De Facto in Kyrgyzstan in 2008.  ''De-facto became very popular and is still in the frontline among Kyrgyz language newspapers in Kyrgyzstan, where Cholpon sold her shares in 2012.

She has almost 20 years of professional experience in journalism and project management. She started her career in 1994 as a correspondent of the Kyrgyz newspaper “Obon” and was a youngest team member.

Family matters 

Cholpon Orozobekova is married and has three daughters. Her husband is Kyrgyz journalist Jengishbek Edigeev (in Kyrgyz - Жеңишбек Эдигеев), who also graduated the Faculty of Journalism at the Kyrgyz National University named after Jusup Balasagyn in Bishkek, Kyrgyzstan.  He recently, published a Kyrgyz-French dictionary.

Select publication list

 A Post- Karimov Uzbekistan, The Diplomat, published on September 3, 2016, https://thediplomat.com/2016/09/a-post-karimov-uzbekistan/
 New Standoff Between Kyrgyzstan and Uzbekistan, The Jamestown Foundation, Eurasia Daily Monitor, Volume 13, Issue, 146, https://jamestown.org/program/new-standoff-between-kyrgyzstan-and-uzbekistan/
 Tajikistan: The Iron Fist Closes, The Diplomat, published on June 8, 2016, https://thediplomat.com/2016/06/tajikistan-the-iron-fist-closes/
 China Relocating Heave Enterprises to Kyrgyzstan, The Jamestown Foundation, Eurasia Daily Monitor, Volume 13, Issue 14, https://jamestown.org/program/china-relocating-heavy-enterprises-to-kyrgyzstan/
 Central Asia and the ISIS Phantom, The Diplomat Magazine, October 5, 2015, https://thediplomat.com/2015/10/central-asia-and-the-isis-phantom/
 Kyrgyzstan's Capacity to Meet Its CASA-1000 Obligations Comes Under Question, The Jamestown Foundation, Eurasia Daily Monitor, Volume 13, https://jamestown.org/program/kyrgyzstans-capacity-to-meet-its-casa-1000-obligations-comes-under-question/
 The US Drone Policy under International Law, Institute of Regional Studies, Islamabad, Spotlight on Regional Affairs, Vol xxxiv, Nos. 11 & 12, http://www.irs.org.pk/spotlight/spnd2015.pdf
The US Drone Policy under International Law, The Denmark Times, published on January 18, 2016, http://denmarktimes.dk/the-us-drone-policy-under-international-law-2/
 An Absence of Diplomacy: The Kyrgyz-Uzbek Border Dispute, The Diplomat Magazine, published on April 1. 2016, https://thediplomat.com/2016/04/an-absence-of-diplomacy-the-kyrgyz-uzbek-border-dispute/
 Central Asia's Presidents-For-Life, The Diplomat Magazine, published on 5 February 2016, https://thediplomat.com/2016/02/central-asias-presidents-for-life/
 Why Russia-Turkey Tensions Cannot Affect Energy Deals, The Journal of Turkish Weekly, published on 26 January 2016, https://web.archive.org/web/20161005115803/http://www.turkishweekly.net/2016/01/26/op-ed/why-turkey-russia-tensions-cannot-affect-energy-deals/
 Trouble in Tajikistan, The Diplomat Magazine, published on 15 September 2015, https://thediplomat.com/2015/09/trouble-in-tajikistan/
 Will Kyrgyzstan Go Russian on NGOs, The Diplomat Magazine, published on 22 October 2015, https://thediplomat.com/2015/10/will-kyrgyzstan-go-russian-on-ngos/
 Can Russia Embrace a New Model for Central Asia? EurasiaNet, published on November 1, 2010, http://www.eurasianet.org/node/62119
 The Deep Roots of Nepotism in Central Asia, Radio Free Europe/Radio Liberty, published on 15 December 2010, http://www.rferl.org/content/deep_roots_of_nepotism_in_central_asia/2249061.html

References and web resources

 http://www.kchr.org/modules.php?name=News&file=article&sid=2317 
 http://www.eurasianet.org/taxonomy/term/3174 
 https://jamestown.org/analyst/cholpon-orozobekova/ 
 http://www.media.kg/news/nina-zotova-naskolko-ya-znayu-cholpon-orozobekova-poluchila-status-bezhenca-v-odnoj-iz-severnyx-stran/

Kyrgyzstani journalists
Kyrgyzstani scholars
1975 births
Living people
Kyrgyzstani women journalists
People from Naryn Region
Kyrgyzstani women writers
20th-century women writers
21st-century women writers
Kyrgyz National University alumni
Graduate Institute of International and Development Studies alumni